These are the election results of the 2013 Malaysian general election by parliamentary constituency. These members of parliament (MPs) will be representing their constituency from the first sitting of 13th Malaysian Parliament to its dissolution.

The parliamentary election deposit was set at RM 10,000 per candidate. Similar to previous elections, the election deposit will be forfeited if the particular candidate had failed to secure at least 12.5% or one-eighth of the votes.

Summary of results

Perlis  
For more details on Pelan dan Helaian Mata (Scoresheet) Bahagian Pilihan Raya Persekutuan Perlis, see footnote

Kedah 
For more details on Pelan dan Helaian Mata (Scoresheet) Bahagian Pilihan Raya Persekutuan Kedah, see footnote

Kelantan 
For more details on Pelan dan Helaian Mata (Scoresheet) Bahagian Pilihan Raya Persekutuan Kelantan, see footnote

Terengganu 
For more details on Pelan dan Helaian Mata (Scoresheet) Bahagian Pilihan Raya Persekutuan Terengganu, see footnote

Penang 
For more details on Pelan dan Helaian Mata (Scoresheet) Bahagian Pilihan Raya Persekutuan Pulau Pinang, see footnote

Perak 
For more details on Pelan dan Helaian Mata (Scoresheet) Bahagian Pilihan Raya Persekutuan Perak, see footnote

Pahang 
For more details on Pelan dan Helaian Mata (Scoresheet) Bahagian Pilihan Raya Persekutuan Pahang, see footnote

Selangor 
For more details on Pelan dan Helaian Mata (Scoresheet) Bahagian Pilihan Raya Persekutuan Selangor, see footnote

Federal Territory of Kuala Lumpur 
For more details on Pelan dan Helaian Mata (Scoresheet) Bahagian Pilihan Raya Persekutuan Wilayah Persekutuan Kuala Lumpur, see footnote

Federal Territory of Putrajaya 
For more details on Pelan dan Helaian Mata (Scoresheet) Bahagian Pilihan Raya Persekutuan Wilayah Persekutuan Putrajaya, see footnote

Negeri Sembilan 
For more details on Pelan dan Helaian Mata (Scoresheet) Bahagian Pilihan Raya Persekutuan Negeri Sembilan, see footnote

Malacca

Johor

Federal Territory of Labuan

Sabah

Sarawak

References 

General elections in Malaysia
2013 elections in Malaysia
2013 in Malaysia
Election results in Malaysia